Tonderai Chavhanga (born 24 December 1983) is a South African rugby union player. Chavhanga has played for the national team, the Springboks, having been capped four times.

Childhood
Chavhanga was born in Harare, Zimbabwe. He was raised by his mother, who had a strong influence on his religious views. His mother worked in construction and built the house in which he grew up. Although poor his mother supported him financially and was the biggest influence on him. His father played very little role in his life, as he remarried and was uninvolved in his up bringing.

Chavhanga played rugby for the first time in Grade 5, at Harare's government-owned Blakiston Primary School. Even at a young age, Tonderai's speed qualities were evident as he was much quicker than his peers. He made first team rugby for three consecutive years at primary school and made the Harare Schools Representative team for three straight years playing fullback.
Chavhanga attended Prince Edward School in Zimbabwe on a scholarship. He was the youngest player in the history of the school to play for the school's first team.

Career
Chavhanga played for the Stormers in the international Super Rugby competition. He left Cape Town in 2010 after he signed a two-year contract with the Lions in September 2009.

Chavhanga made his international debut for the Springboks as a 21-year-old on 11 June 2005 on the right wing, in a home game against Uruguay at the Basil Kenyon Stadium in East London. The Springboks notched up a large victory, winning 134–3. Chavhanga scored six tries in the match and now holds the South African record for the most number of tries scored in one game. He missed the end of year touring matches, because of a quad muscle injury.

He was selected as part of the Springboks squad to tour New Zealand and Australia. He was on the bench for the game against the All Blacks in Christchurch.
He could run the 100 meters in 10.27 seconds, possibly making him the fastest rugby player in South African history.

Chavhanga joined Welsh regional side Newport Gwent Dragons in September 2011, but was released  at the end of the 2012–2013 season.

He returned to South Africa and was included in the  squad for the 2013 Currie Cup Premier Division season.

Test history

Xenophobia
He made a strong statement against xenophobia when he addressed media, in his capacity as a Springbok on the 2008 xenophobic attacks. He also clearly stated that he was a Shona, a Zimbabwean ethnic tribe.

See also
List of South Africa national rugby union players – Springbok no. 768

References

External links
Lions profile
Tonderai Chavhanga on Springbok Rugby Hall of Fame
Tonderai Chavhanga on SARugby.com
Tonderai Chavhanga on itsrugby.co.uk
Tonderai Pace Explosion Witness the express pace on YouTube.com
Tondie transfers to Lions
Newport Gwent Dragons squad

1983 births
Living people
Rugby union wings
South African rugby union players
South Africa international rugby union players
Stormers players
Western Province (rugby union) players
Dragons RFC players
Alumni of Prince Edward School
Golden Lions players
Lions (United Rugby Championship) players
South African expatriate rugby union players
Expatriate rugby union players in Wales
South African expatriate sportspeople in Wales
Sharks (rugby union) players
South Africa international rugby sevens players
Male rugby sevens players